Sigrid Nansen is a superhero in American comic books published by DC Comics, first appearing in Super Friends #9 (Dec 1977). Originally the first character to use the name Icemaiden, they replaced the hero known as Ice for a time. They are among the few ice-theme superheroes in the DC Universe. The character is eventually re-introduced during "Infinite Frontier", adopting a new identity as Glacier and identifies as non-binary.

Fictional character biography

Global Guardians
Sigrid Nansen received their powers as the result of an experiment funded by the Norwegian government. In an attempt to please both their overbearing scientist mother (who constantly belittled them for not having a boyfriend and not being a top scientist) and the Norwegian government, Sigrid reluctantly agreed to the experiments. The goal was to duplicate the abilities of what at the time were a legendary tribe of Ice-people; the experiment was a success, though as a side-effect Sigrid's skin was permanently turned blue. Taking the name Icemaiden, they joined the Global Guardians as their country's representative to that international super-team.

Legends
During the DC miniseries Legends (1986) the people of the United States were turned against all heroes, superheroes, and metahumans; the President even decreed that no costumed hero could operate legally. This did not affect the Global Guardians, however, who worked outside of the U.S. During this time, what Sylvester Pemberton referred to as the "Great Super-Hero Scare" Doctor Mist sent Icemaiden, along with Rising Sun, the Tasmanian Devil, and the Green Flame to Canada to run security for the international Trade Conference. Icemaiden fell victim, however, to the group calling itself Injustice Unlimited, and was hypnotized into serving the villains. This resulted in them traveling to Greenland with Jade and the new Icicle on a mission to find and free Solomon Grundy. In the end, the villains were defeated and Icemaiden regained their free will.

Resignation
Upon the discovery of a real tribe of Ice-people, their princess Tora Olafsdotter (Ice) joined the Global Guardians. This led Sigrid to quit the team.

Justice League
Years later, after Ice had left the Global Guardians, joined the Justice League International, and was killed by the Overmaster, Sigrid re-emerged. They chose to honor the fallen heroine by serving as her replacement in the Justice League.

There were hints of a romantic relationship with their teammate Fire, but this was all part of a plan hatched by Sigrid. Realizing Fire was not coping with Ice's death (and Fire was attempting to control them, much like Sigrid's mother had done growing up), they dressed up to resemble Ice and showed romantic feelings toward Fire. The shock made Fire realize that Ice was gone, and she could not recreate the past. During their time in the JLA, they were disliked and criticized by Guy Gardner, who had also not come to terms with Ice's death.

They left active duty with the League after they and several others were heavily wounded during the attack of the Hyperclan (White Martians). Later recovered, Sigrid resumed their superhero career and is assumed to have eventually joined an unofficial branch of Justice League Europe. That League chapter was, however, infiltrated by the Mist, who apparently lured Icemaiden away and subsequently disguised herself as the blue-skinned hero before killing three League members: Crimson Fox, Amazing Man, and Blue Devil.

In the same story, it was revealed that Mist covertly contacted Icemaiden and informed them of a supposed threat facing their homeland of Norway, and they must defeat the threat without informing anyone until afterwards. Icemaiden left during the middle of the night, and Mist replaced them within the JLE by the next morning. The JLE did not know that Mist replaced Icemaiden until Mist began her attacks against them. Mist informed Crimson Fox that the threat she informed Icemaiden about was not real, and that she had sent Icemaiden on an ultimately fruitless search so that she could disguise herself as Icemaiden and replace them on the team.

One Year Later

After the "Infinite Crisis" storyline, it was revealed that Icemaiden had at some point been abducted by the supervillain Warp, a capture paid for by a mysterious "organ-napper" who turned out to be former film actress Delores Winters. Winters—believed to have been killed decades earlier by the Ultra-Humanite—longed for new flesh to replace her own aging skin and had her personal physician surgically flay the Icemaiden in order to harvest their superpowered skin. Icemaiden did not die, however, and eventually was placed, comatose, into a hydration womb within a facility of S.T.A.R. Labs. Later, in the same story, the hydration womb is cracked. It is unknown if Icemaiden survived.

It is mentioned in this story that Icemaiden has alabaster skin, although they had blue skin in all of their prior appearances save for their appearances in Extreme Justice.

Delores was recently killed in a battle with Batwoman, and her corpse was taken by the Justice League. It is unknown if they will be able to remove the skin.

Infinite Frontier 
Sigrid returned in the winter holiday special "Tis the Season to be Freezin" in Andrew Wheeler and Meghan Hetrick's "Break the Ice" story and takes the codename of Glacier. Sigrid is referred to using they/them pronouns at the end. Andrew Wheeler stated on Twitter that Sigrid was nonbinary.

Relationships
Sigrid is one of the few bisexual superheroes operating in the DC Universe. They were flirtatious with Nuklon during their time together in the JLA, and then later became involved with Olivia Reynolds, the ex-girlfriend of Hal Jordan.

They also showed interest in Judaism during their conversations with Nuklon.

After Tis the Season to Be Freezin Sigrid is now known to be nonbinary.

Powers and abilities
Sigrid Nansen possesses abilities surrounding ice, snow and cold. Their powers are not natural, as they are the result of scientific experiments. Whether it was a success because they had a dormant gene is unknown. Icemaiden can control small quantities of snow or ice in varying degrees, such as projecting ice shields and icicles from their body. These capabilities are also closely linked to Sigrid's mental state.

References

External links
 Ice Maiden at Comic Vine

Comics characters introduced in 1977
DC Comics LGBT superheroes
DC Comics metahumans
Fictional Norwegian people
Fictional characters with ice or cold abilities
Fictional non-binary people